The women's 200 metres event at the 1989 Summer Universiade was held at the Wedaustadion in Duisburg with the final on 27 and 28 August 1989.

Medalists

Results

Heats
Wind:Heat 1: +0.9 m/s, Heat 2: +0.9 m/s, Heat 3: +0.6 m/s

Semifinals
Wind:Heat 1: +2.5 m/s, Heat 2: +1.8 m/s

Final

Wind: +0.3 m/s

References

Athletics at the 1989 Summer Universiade
1989